Chalmers "Chal" Port (August 9, 1931 – August 20, 2011) was a college baseball coach at The Citadel, The Military College of South Carolina.  Most famous for leading Bulldogs to the 1990 College World Series, Port coached for 27 seasons garnering a 641–386–2 record.  His win total was only surpassed in 2010 by successor Fred Jordan, who played for Port.

Playing career
Port played football and baseball at the University of North Carolina prior to a brief minor league career.

Coaching career

In his 27 seasons at The Citadel, Port led the Bulldogs to five NCAA Division I Baseball Championship appearances and graduated all but two players he coached.

1990 College World Series season
In his second to last season, Port led the 1990 The Citadel Bulldogs baseball team in a dominant season, claiming the Southern Conference regular season and tournament championships, the nation's longest winning streak of 26 games, and the school's first appearance in the College World Series.  Sweeping through the SoCon Tournament and the Atlantic Regional in Coral Gables, Florida, the Bulldogs defeated national power  on its home field twice to advance to Omaha.  Following an opening round loss to LSU, the Bulldogs defeated  in extra innings.  The Citadel was eliminated by LSU in its third game in Omaha.  The Bulldogs were ranked sixth in the Collegiate Baseball final poll.  Following the season, Port was named Sporting News National Baseball Coach of the Year.

Head coaching record

References

1931 births
2011 deaths
Baseball pitchers
Baseball players from Pennsylvania
The Citadel Bulldogs baseball coaches
North Carolina Tar Heels baseball players
North Carolina Tar Heels football players
Players of American football from Pennsylvania
People from Juniata County, Pennsylvania